Isla Pérez is an island located in the Gulf of Mexico, 130 km (80.7 mi) north of Progreso, Mexico, off the coast of the Yucatán Peninsula.  It belongs to the Arrecife Alacranes National Park, and is the largest island in the archipelago.
  
The waters and coral reefs surrounding the island provide an important refuge for sea life and attract many fishermen to the region.   The island has little vegetation, with a hot and dry climate that is not hospitable to human life.

Historically, the island has been used as a navigation reference point in the southern Gulf of Mexico, particularly for mariners between the Yucatán Channel and Bay of Campeche.
Because of its importance to navigation, the Mexican Navy has stationed a small detachment there.

See also 
 List of reefs
 Scorpion Reef

References 

 Yucatán en el tiempo. Enciclopedia Alfabética. México 1998.  

Coral reefs
Biosphere reserves of Mexico
Islands of Yucatán
Reefs of Mexico
Protected areas of Yucatán